Protein phosphatase 1 regulatory subunit 15A also known as growth arrest and DNA damage-inducible protein GADD34 is a protein that in humans is encoded by the PPP1R15A gene.

The Gadd34/MyD116  gene was originally discovered as a member in a set of gadd and MyD mammalian genes encoding acidic proteins that synergistically suppress cell growth. Later on it has been characterized as a gene playing a role in ER stress-induced cell death, being a target of ATF4 that plays a role in ER-mediated cell death via promoting protein dephosphorylation of eIF2α and reversing translational inhibition.

Function 

This gene is a member of a group of genes whose transcript levels are increased following stressful growth arrest conditions and treatment with DNA-damaging agents. The induction of this gene by ionizing radiation occurs in certain cell lines regardless of p53 status, and its protein response is correlated with apoptosis following ionizing radiation.

Interactions
PPP1R15A has been shown to interact with:
 BAG1 
 LYN, 
 MLL,
 PPP1CA, 
 PPP1CB, 
 PPP1CC, 
 SMARCB1, and
 TSN.

References

Further reading